Bittereinderdag (Bitter-ender Day) is celebrated annually on May 31 by Afrikaners, commemorating the Boer Commando guerillas known as bittereinders who fought during the Second Boer War.

Overview 

From 1899 to 1902, the Second Boer War was fought between the British Empire and the Boer republics. During the later stages of the conflict, Boer Commando units which continued to wage a guerilla war against British forces even though the regular forces of the Boer republics had already been defeated, who were known in common parlance as bittereinders. On May 31, 1902, the Treaty of Vereeniging was signed between British and Boer negotiators, bringing an end to the war.

During the 20th century, the bittereinderdag holiday was created by Afrikaners to honor both the memory of the bittereinders and all Boers who died during the conflict. The holiday is celebrated by Afrikaner nationalists, including in the white separatist town of Orania, South Africa, which only permits Afrikaners to reside within the town. The Orania municipal government does not celebrate any of the public holidays in South Africa, instead choosing to celebrate alternate holidays instead.

See also 
 Bittereinder

References 

Afrikaner nationalism